Hamilton High School is located in the Bitterroot Valley in Hamilton, Montana, United States. As of the 2019–20 school year there were 474 students in grades 9–12 with a student to teacher ratio of 14.74 to 1. Graduating classes are generally around 125 students. The school mascot is the Bronc. Hamilton High School was rebuilt in the year 2000. The old Hamilton High School now serves as the Hamilton Middle School. The 700-seat Hamilton Performing Arts Center is located in Hamilton High School.

Hamilton High School classifies as a Class "A" school in the Montana High School Association.  It is a member of the Southwestern "A" conference for most sports.

References

External links

localschooldirectory.com
overview of Hamilton High School

Public high schools in Montana
Schools in Ravalli County, Montana
Hamilton, Montana